Shoreline Community College is a public community college in Shoreline, Washington. It is located in a residential area east of Shoreview Park. The college contains over 80 acres and continuously serves 12,000 full- and part-time students. It opened in 1964 and offers degree and certificate programs.

History 

Shoreline Community College was the brain-child of Ray W. Howard, superintendent of the Shoreline School District.  He felt that Washington state's increasing host of high school graduates did not have adequate opportunities for higher education and "actively worked with other school districts in the area to convince legislators of the needs of 'non-traditional' students who could not, because of economic circumstances, attend the University of Washington or other four-year institutions." In 1959 he brought forward the idea of a community college in Shoreline.

Shoreline Community College started with evening classes in January 1964, accepting 806 student applications that would be taught at Shoreline High School which is now Shoreline Center. Dr. Howard "retired as superintendent in 1963, and spent his last two years with the district planning and opening the new Shoreline Community College." 

"The Boeing family eventually donated approximately 83 acres on a wooded bluff to Shoreline Community College," and the site was cleared for construction in the early 1960s. "In the fall of 1965, the new campus was ready for students."

According to a study released in October 2013, Shoreline Community College is the best value for an associate degree in the state of Washington and among the best in the nation. As pointed out in the study, graduates are shown to earn $456,269 more in their lifetime than they would without the associate degree.

Academics
Shoreline Community College offers several transfer degrees and more than 100 professional, technical, and workforce training degrees and certificates, some short-term, others taking up to two years to complete. Shoreline Community College has international students enrolled from 45 countries. Over 140 scholarships are awarded annually, as well as over $14.4 million in financial aid.

National Alternative Fuels Training Consortium 

In 2006 Shoreline Community College was recognized as one of 27 colleges nationwide to offer NAFTC's alternative fuel vehicle (AFV) training and outreach center. The school's automotive program has received statewide recognition for its specialized program.

Library 
The library on campus was one of the first three buildings to be constructed when the college was founded. In 1981 the library was named in honor of Ray W. Howard near the time of the founding superintendent's retirement. It was remodeled in late 2016 and early 2017. Recently celebrating its 5 millionth visitor, the Ray W. Howard library serves students of Shoreline Community College, faculty, staff, and has some services available to the general public. Students of participating nearby colleges may use their institution's ID card to check out materials from the library as well.

The Ray Howard Library has a print collection that includes nonfiction, reference, foreign language materials, an ESL collection, journals, magazines, and a small popular books section with some graphic novels.  While the print collection is supportive of Shoreline Community College's curriculum, the digital resources include academic and trade journals, magazine and newspaper articles, e-books, reference books, and streaming video. There are three computer labs in the Ray W. Howard Library that provide access to all the digital resources without a login as well as a long list of software. The librarians teach workshops, consultations and individual sessions to students and others who are learning the research process. Students and other users can request a Librarian Prescription, on which Librarians will note keywords, key resources, and ideas for the research process. Ray W. Howard participates in the online chat collaborative service, Ask WA which ensures that students have a way to ask questions 24 hours a day, 7 days a week.

Publications 
 The Ebbtide is SCC's student newspaper.
 Spindrift is SCC's Arts and Literary Journal, released annually.
 1000 Words is a quarterly publication released by f-stop, the Photography club at SCC.

Notable alumni and faculty

Alumni
Terrell Brown Jr, professional basketball player
Halvor Hagen, professional football player
Rod Harrel, actor/writer/director in theatre, video production, and film production 
Bob Hasegawa, member of the Washington State Senate
Rick Kaminski, printer, real estate agent, and stadium food hawker
John Lovick, member of the Washington State Senate
Rudy Pantoja, local gardener and politician, known for "Hugh Mungus" incident
Avery Scharer, professional basketball player
Joseph J. Tyson, Bishop of Yakima

Faculty
 Donn Charnley, member of the Washington State Senate
 Patty Murray, member of the U.S. Senate

References

External links 

Official website

Community colleges in Washington (state)
Universities and colleges accredited by the Northwest Commission on Colleges and Universities
Educational institutions established in 1964
Universities and colleges in King County, Washington
Shoreline, Washington
1964 establishments in Washington (state)